Mark Smith (born May 17, 1956) is an American fencer, engineer and educator. He competed in the team foil event at the 1984 Summer Olympics. From 2003 to 2009, he served as the 18th head of Purdue University School of Electrical and Computer Engineering. Smith is now the dean of the graduate school at The University of Texas at Austin.

References

External links
 

1956 births
Living people
American male foil fencers
Olympic fencers of the United States
Fencers at the 1984 Summer Olympics
Sportspeople from New York City
Purdue University faculty
Pan American Games medalists in fencing
Pan American Games silver medalists for the United States
University of Texas at Austin faculty
Fencers at the 1983 Pan American Games